SS Vespasian was a steel-hulled cargo steamship that was built in Sunderland in 1887 as Eastern Prince, renamed Vespasian in 1908 and scrapped in Newcastle upon Tyne in 1914. In 1908 the Parsons Marine Steam Turbine Company converted her to steam turbine propulsion. She is notable as the first ship in the World whose turbines drove her propeller by reduction gearing instead of direct drive.

Eastern Prince 1887–1908
Short Brothers of Sunderland built Eastern Prince in Pallion, Sunderland, launching her on 17 September 1887. She had a clipper bow and clipper stern, two masts and one funnel. As built, Eastern Prince had a three-cylinder triple-expansion steam engine built by George Clark of Southwick.

Eastern Prince was built for the Prince Steam Shipping Company, which was managed by James Knott of Newcastle. In 1892 her net register tonnage was revised to 1,378. In 1899 her ownership was transferred to Prince Line, under the same management. In 1908 Wilson and Wilson of Newcastle bought her, but in the same year sold her on to the Parsons Marine Steam Turbine Company.

Marine turbine flexiblity and efficiency
This meant that their propellers ran at turbine speed, which was much faster than the speed of reciprocating marine steam engines.

Parsons sought a way for turbines to propel slower ships efficiently.

In 1897 a  steam launch was built with a single turbine driving twin propellers via helical reduction gearing. Her turbine ran at 20,000 rpm and the reduction gear ratio was 14 to 1. But it was not until 1908 that Parsons scaled up the concept to be applied to a ship.

Vespasian 1908–14
The Parsons company renamed the ship Vespasian, thoroughly overhauled her, and tested her triple-expansion engine for coal and water consumption. Parsons replaced the engine with twin steam turbines that drove her propeller shaft by reduction gearing. She kept the same boilers, propeller and propeller shaft.

Parsons found that the turbine used 15 percent less coal than the triple-expansion engine. Parsons then altered her propeller, which increased the fuel saving to 22 percent. The turbines also used less water than her triple-expansion engine. The turbines ran at 1,400 rpm, and drove her propeller shaft at 70 rpm via single-reduction gearing.

The Parsons company ran Vespasian as a collier, carrying coal from Newcastle to Rotterdam. By 1911 she had covered  in all weathers and delivered 90,000 tons of coal.

Fate
In 1913 Cairns & Noble bought Vespasian for her turbines. Vespasian was scrapped in Newcastle in the first half of 1914. William Doxford & Sons installed the turbines in the cargo ship Lord Byron, which was launched in 1916 and completed in 1917. The turbines survived until 1931, when Lord Byron was re-engined with a triple-expansion engine.

References

Bibliography

1887 ships
Cargo ships of the United Kingdom
Experimental ships
Ships built on the River Wear
Steamships of the United Kingdom